U.S. Route 67 (US 67) is a major U.S. highway in the state of Texas. It runs from the US-Mexico Border west of Presidio to Texarkana at the Texas-Arkansas border. US 67 is part of the La Entrada al Pacifico international trade corridor from its southern terminus to US 385 in McCamey.

Route description
US 67 enters Texas from Mexico as Federal Highway 16 west of Presidio. US 67 travels miles between Chinati Mountains State Natural Area and Big Bend Ranch State Park. US 67 shares an overlap with US 90 from Marfa to Alpine. Leaving US 90, US 67 travels north towards I-10. US 67 shares an overlap with I-10 for almost 25 miles. In Fort Stockton, US 385 joins this overlap. US 67/385 leave I-10 just east of Fort Stockton.

US 67 leaves I-10 with US 385 and the two share an overlap until McCamey. US 67 travels in a mostly east–west direction towards San Angelo. US 67 travels through mostly rural areas, passing through or near the towns of Rankin, Big Lake, and Mertzon. In San Angelo, parts of US 67 are known as the Houston Harte Expressway, named after the San Angelo-native publishing magnate. US 67 starts a short overlap with US 277 in San Angelo along the Houston Harte.

US 67 ends its overlap with US 277 northeast of San Angelo. US 67 travels towards Ballinger and has an overlap with US 83. Between the towns of Santa Anna and Stephenville, US 67 shares overlaps with US highways 84, 183, and 377. The overlap with US 377 starts in Brownwood and ends in south east Stephenville.

US 67 leaves Stephenville and travels to Glen Rose, the location of Dinosaur Valley State Park. US 67 then travels to Cleburne, bypassing the town on a four lane freeway; the bypass is known as Walter P. Holliday Drive from US 67 Business near Lake Pat Cleburne to FM 4, while the remainder is known as Catherine P. Raines Drive. US 67 travels through the towns of Keene, Alvarado, and Venus before entering Midlothian, where a freeway begins that travels all the way to I-35E in Dallas. US 67 shares an unsigned overlap with I-35E/US 77 to Downtown Dallas, where US 67 leaves I-35E and joins I-30.

US 67 shares an unsigned overlap with I-30 that starts in Downtown Dallas. The two highways travel through east Dallas, Mesquite, and Garland, Texas before crossing over Lake Ray Hubbard, twice. After the second crossing, the highways enter Rockwall. In Royse City, US 67 signage begins. The highways then arrive in Greenville.

US 67 travels through Sulphur Springs, before leaving I-30 east of town. US 67 then parallels I-30, occasionally crossing the highway. US 67 passes through the towns of Mount Vernon, and Mount Pleasant. East of Mount Pleasant, US 67 travels miles south of I-30 traveling through Morris County. US 67 travels on the south border of the Lone Star Army Ammunition Plant, before arriving in Texarkana. US 67 travels to downtown where it enters Arkansas at State Line Avenue (US 71/US 82).

Major intersections

Special routes

US 67 has business routes in Presidio, two in San Angelo, Cleburne, Alvarado, and Sulphur Springs. An additional business route has been proposed for Dublin, and Midlothian and Greenville formerly had business routes. These routes largely follow former alignments through these cities before US 67 bypasses were constructed.

See also

Texas State Highway 66
Texas State Highway 78

References
Informational notes

Citations

External links

67-0
 Texas
Transportation in Bowie County, Texas
Transportation in Brewster County, Texas
Transportation in Brown County, Texas
Transportation in Cass County, Texas
Transportation in Coleman County, Texas
Transportation in Comanche County, Texas
Transportation in Crane County, Texas
Transportation in Crockett County, Texas
Transportation in Dallas County, Texas
Transportation in Ellis County, Texas
Transportation in Erath County, Texas
Transportation in Franklin County, Texas
Transportation in Hopkins County, Texas
Transportation in Hunt County, Texas
Transportation in Irion County, Texas
Transportation in Johnson County, Texas
Transportation in Morris County, Texas
Transportation in Pecos County, Texas
Transportation in Presidio County, Texas
Transportation in Reagan County, Texas
Transportation in Rockwall County, Texas
Transportation in Runnels County, Texas
Transportation in Somervell County, Texas
Transportation in Titus County, Texas
Transportation in Tom Green County, Texas
Transportation in Upton County, Texas